The men's K-1 1000 metres event was an individual kayaking event conducted as part of the Canoeing at the 1980 Summer Olympics program.

Medalists

Results

Heats
The 21 competitors first raced in three heats on July 31 though one did not start. The top three finishers from each of the heats advanced directly to the semifinals. All remaining competitors competed in the repechages later that day.

Repechages
Taking place on July 31, two repechages were held. The top three finishers in each repechage advanced to the semifinals.

Semifinals
Raced on August 2, the top three finishers from each of the three semifinals advanced to the final.

Final
The final took place on August 2.

References
1980 Summer Olympics official report Volume 3. p. 184. 
Sports-reference.com 1980 K-1 1000 m results.

Men's K-1 1000
Men's events at the 1980 Summer Olympics